Kevin Kiernan might refer to: -

 Kevin Kiernan (scholar) American scholar
 Kevin Kiernan (geomorphologist) Tasmanian